Hills Bros. Coffee is a maker of packaged coffee, founded in San Francisco.

History
The company has its origins with the sons of shipbuilder Austin Hills (1823-1905), who was born in Rockland, Maine, and ran a business in California building clipper ships. His sons were Austin Herbert Hills (1851-1933), and Reuben Wilmarth Hills I (1856-1934).

"When Reuben and Austin began to produce roasted coffee there were at least twenty-five other companies already engaged in some form of coffee production and distribution in San Francisco including, of course, the well-known Folger Company started by William Bovee (which began in San Francisco thirty years earlier). Most of these coffee businesses were started by family groups which contributed to the growth of San Francisco. San Francisco in the nineteenth century was ripe for the importing and roasting of coffee. The foundation for commercial production of coffee dated back to the 1820s when English planters brought coffee to Costa Rica. By the early 1840s German and Belgian planters followed with coffee plantations in Guatemala and El Salvador, two of the several Central American countries where Hills Bros. would obtain its mild coffee beans. During the Gold Rush (1849) San Francisco rapidly expanded and grew. Coffee was imported and sold, after roasting, to restaurants and hotels. Yankee gold miners and others without equipment to roast and brew their own coffee, populated "coffee houses." In 1873 two brothers, Austin Herbert and Reuben Wilmarth Hills arrived in San Francisco from their home in Rockland, Maine with their father Austin who had come to California some years earlier. Five years later in 1878 A. H. and R. W. Hills established a retail stall to sell dairy products in the Bay City Market under the name of their new partnership Hills Bros. Their small business expanded in less than four years with the acquisition of a retail coffee store titled Arabian Coffee & Spice Mills on Fourth Street in San Francisco. In two more years (1884) still larger quarters were occupied at Sacramento and Sansome Streets."

"In 1898, Edward Norton, of New York, was granted a United States patent on a vacuum process for canning foods, subsequently applied to coffee. Others followed. Hills Brothers, of San Francisco, were the first to pack coffee in a vacuum, under the Norton patents, in 1900.

In 1900, Hills Bros. were the first to pack roast coffee in vacuum sealed cans. They incorporated under the Hills Bros. name in 1906. In 1926 Hills Bros. moved its operations to 2 Harrison Street in San Francisco, a Romanesque revival building on the Embarcadero designed by George W. Kelham that is now a city landmark. The roasting operations once made the surrounding area smell like coffee, according to a Key System "March of Progress" style public service film from 1945  In January 2012, the building had become home to Wharton | San Francisco, a satellite campus of the Wharton School of the University of Pennsylvania. A Wharton sign can be currently seen on the Embarcadero side of the building. Google LLC and the Mozilla Corporation also have offices on several floors of the building.

A symbol of an Arab drinking coffee called "the taster", introduced in 1898, was designed by an artist named Briggs in 1906 but was replaced by a new, European-American, "taster" to represent the original founders in 1990. In 1976, Hills Brothers hired American singer Sergio Franchi as their TV spokesperson to introduce several lines of specialty flavors. Noted character actor John Zaremba was the primary commercial spokesperson for Hills Brothers in the 1970s and early 1980s, portraying a fictional coffee bean buyer.

In 1930 Hills Bros. expanded into Chicago. On 2 November 1938, Hills Brothers Coffee Company filed a petition to rezone 37 ½ acres for industrial purposes to build a plant in Elmhurst, Illinois, north of the North Western tracks to where Schiller Street extended beyond Geneva Avenue. Opposition caused Hills to drop its request.

During World War II, the company's metal containers were replaced with glass jars. In 1984 they purchased the name and manufacturing facilities of the Chase & Sanborn Coffee Company.

In 1985 Nestlé bought Hills Bros. and MJB coffee companies. Hills Bros. opened a new roasting plant in Suffolk, Virginia in 1988. The San Francisco headquarters were closed in 1997, moving operations to Nestlé's U.S. headquarters in Glendale, California. Nestlé sold Hills Bros. to Sara Lee in 1999. Massimo Zanetti Beverage USA purchased the brand in 2006. Massimo Zanetti Beverage USA is headquartered at the Suffolk plant. Austin E. Hills was, formerly, chairman of the board of directors.

Thomas Carroll Wilson

See also
 Grgich Hills Estate, winery (business partners: Mike Grgich and Austin Hills)
 MJB (coffee), a San Francisco-founded brand of coffee
 Folgers, a San Francisco-founded brand of coffee

References

External links

 Official website
 Hills Bros. Arabian Coffee and Spice Mills, 400 Harrison Street, San Francisco, (1886) photo
 

Coffee brands
Coffee companies of the United States
Massimo Zanetti brands
Manufacturing companies based in San Francisco
Food and drink companies based in San Francisco
Cuisine of the Western United States
1906 establishments in California
Sara Lee Corporation brands
Drink companies based in California